Assi Rahbani (May 4, 1923 – June 21, 1986) was a Lebanese composer, musician, and producer. He was part of the Rahbani Brothers, with his brother Mansour Rahbani. He married Lebanese singer Nouhad Haddad, more famous by her stage name, Fairuz. Their son Ziad Rahbani is also a very successful artist in music, theatre, and an influential political activist.

Career

The early years
Assi Rahbani's musical career began when he obtained a job at the Near East Radio channel (إذاعة الشرق الأدنى). In 1951, Nouhad Haddad (later known as Fairuz), one of the singers in the radio station's chorus, came to the attention of Halim El Roumi, the musical director. Assi composed her very first song, "Itab" ("Reproach"). El Roumi attended the recording session and asked Assi to compose additional songs for her. The trio released about 50 songs for the station.  In 1956, during the Suez Crisis, the Rahbani brothers, along with Fairuz, left the Near East Radio Station due to its alleged bias and anti-Arab propaganda in its coverage of the Crisis. The Rahbani Brothers and Fairuz became an independent musical group.  Both of the Rahbani Brothers composed and both of them wrote lyrics as they always clarified in interviews and as attested by their family members as well as by artists who collaborated and worked with them.  The trio would eventually rise to become one of the most prominent groups in both the Lebanese and Middle Eastern music markets.  In 1957, the trio performed for the first time at the Baalbeck International Festival.

Lebanese Civil War
After the Lebanese Civil War erupted, the Rahbanis continued to use political satire and sharp criticism in their plays. In 1977, their musical Petra was shown in both the Muslim western and Christian eastern portions of Beirut. In 1978, the trio toured Europe and the Persian Gulf nations, including a concert at the Paris Olympia.  Assi and his brother continued to compose musicals for Ronza and Fadia Tomb El-Hage (Ronza's sister). They remade their musical Al Sha'khs (The Person) which they had first performed with Fairuz in the early 1970s. The songs were re-recorded with Ronza's voice; the production featured a small role played by Rima Rahbani, the youngest daughter of Fairuz and Assi.

Personal life and health
Aside from Rahbani's professional relationship with Fairuz, the two were also a couple.  In 1953, Rahbani proposed to Fairuz and the couple married a year later.  On Sept 22, 1972, Rahbani suffered a brain hemorrhage and was hospitalized at Rizk Hospital in Beirut, Lebanon.  Fans crowded outside the hospital and held a candlelight vigil. After three surgeries, the hemorrhage was halted.
His demanding career eventually started taking a toll on his health.  By the late 1970s, Rahbani's mental health began to deteriorate.  Fairuz and the Rahbani Brothers agreed to end their professional and personal relationship in 1979, which also included Fairuz separating from Assi Rahbani.  Fairouz began to work with a production team led by her son, Ziad Rahbani, and the Rahbani Brothers composed for other artists.
On June 26, 1986 Assi Rahbani died after spending several weeks in a coma.

References

External links
 FairuzFan - The Web Site of Every Fairuz Fan

1923 births
1986 deaths
Lebanese composers
Lebanese musicians
Lebanese songwriters
Greek Orthodox Christians from Lebanon
Eastern Orthodox Christians from Lebanon